Load Blown is the fourth studio album by American experimental noise band Black Dice. It was released on 23 October 2007 on Paw Tracks Records. The album consists of tracks previously issued as limited edition vinyl releases over an 18-month period: the three-track "Manoman" 12" on DFA Records, the "Roll Up/Drool" 12" on Paw Tracks, and the five-track Load Blown 12" EP. 

The album received favorable reviews, with Pitchfork describing it as a "new take on Black Dice's idiosyncratic mix, where attention to detail, openness to possibility, and intuitive senses of rhythm and timing all collide."

Track listing 

"Kokomo" - 3:35
"Roll Up" - 7:10
"Gore" - 4:12
"Bottom Feeder" - 2:50
"Scavenger" - 5:16
"Drool" - 5:51
"Toka Toka" - 4:07
"Cowboy Soundcheck" - 1:49
"Bananas" - 4:36
"Manoman" - 6:49

References

Black Dice albums
2007 albums